Gary Louis Eave (born July 22, 1963) is a former Major League Baseball pitcher for the Atlanta Braves (-) and Seattle Mariners.

College Baseball

Grambling State 
Gary played 2 years of division 1 NCAA baseball for the Grambling State Tigers where he had a 75% win percentage, winning 18 of his 24 games. He gave up 0 home runs and struck out 157 batters in his 172.2 innings with the Tigers.

Minor and Major League Career

Braves 
Gary Eave was drafted in the 12th round of the 1985 MLB draft to the Atlanta Braves. After being drafted, he was placed on the Braves rookie team, the Gulf Coast Braves, where he played 3 games before being moved up to the Sumter Braves, a A team in 1986. In 1988, Eave played his first MLB season with the Braves. His first game was against the Houston Astros, who had Nolan Ryan on the mound. Eave would only pitch 2 innings of this game and the team would go on to lose 3–8. Gary pitched a total of 5 games and only 5 innings in his first MLB season. In 1990, Eave was traded to the Seattle Mariners.

Mariners 
After being traded to the Mariners, Eave spent some time playing for the Calgary Cannons, a AAA team owned by the Mariners. During his time with the Cannons, he had a 3–3 win-loss record and a 7.82 ERA. Gary wore number 37 in his only season with the Seattle Mariners. During this time, he had a 0–3 win-loss record and an ERA of 4.20. Eave then bounced around between AA and AAA teams before being cut from the team before the 1992 season.

References

External links
, or Pura Pelota (Venezuelan Winter League), or Taiwanese Baseball Card Sets

1963 births
Living people
Acereros de Monclova players
African-American baseball players
American expatriate baseball players in Canada
American expatriate baseball players in Mexico
American expatriate baseball players in Taiwan
Atlanta Braves players
Baseball players from Louisiana
Bayou Bullfrogs players
Calgary Cannons players
China Times Eagles players
Corpus Christi Barracudas players
Durham Bulls players
Grambling State Tigers baseball players
Greenville Braves players
Gulf Coast Braves players
Jacksonville Suns players
Leones de Yucatán players
Major League Baseball pitchers
Mexican League baseball pitchers
People from Monroe, Louisiana
Phoenix Firebirds players
Richmond Braves players
Seattle Mariners players
Sumter Braves players
Tiburones de La Guaira players
American expatriate baseball players in Venezuela
21st-century African-American people
20th-century African-American sportspeople